Drag kings are mostly female performance artists who dress in masculine drag and personify male gender stereotypes as part of an individual or group routine. A typical drag show may incorporate dancing, acting, stand-up comedy and singing, either live or lip-synching to pre-recorded tracks. Drag kings often perform as exaggeratedly macho male characters, portray marginalised masculinities such as construction workers and rappers or they will impersonate male celebrities like Elvis Presley, Michael Jackson and Tim McGraw.

In the late 1800s and early 1900s, several drag kings became British music hall stars and British pantomime has preserved the tradition of women performing in male roles. Starting in the mid-1990s, drag kings started to gain some of the fame and attention that drag queens have known.

History and terminology

While the term drag king was first cited in print in 1972, there is a longer history of female performers dressing in male attire. In China, the practice of "female men [characters]" (kunsheng; see also sheng roles), where women portrayed men in stage performances, were first documented during the middle Tang dynasty (617-908 CE). This continued through to the early Qing dynasty, when the Qianlong Emperor banned actresses from performing in 1722. It was revived in the late 19th and 20th centuries as the ban on actresses was loosened. 

In theatre and opera there was a tradition of breeches roles and en travesti. Actress and playwright Susanna Centlivre appeared in breeches roles around 1700. The first popular male impersonator in U.S. theatre was Annie Hindle, who started performing in New York in 1867. In 1886 she married her dresser, Annie Ryan. 

British music hall performer Vesta Tilley was active in the late 19th and early 20th centuries as a male impersonator. Other male impersonators on the British stage were Ella Shields and Hetty King. Blues singer Gladys Bentley performed in male attire in New York, Los Angeles and San Francisco from the 1920s through 1940s. 

Stormé DeLarverie performed in male drag as the MC, and sole female performer, of the of the drag troupe the Jewel Box Revue in the 1950s and 1960s. She is featured in the documentary Storme: The Lady of the Jewel Box. While the Stonewall riots of June, 1969, were a series of spontaneous uprisings by many people, DeLarverie - who was the first to fight back against the police brutality - is believed to have provided the spark that ignited the riot. 

Drag king culture in Australia flourished in lesbian bars from the 1990s and 2000s, but began to fade in the 2010s.

The term drag king is sometimes used in a broader sense, to include female-bodied people who dress in traditionally masculine clothing for other reasons. This usage includes women temporarily attempting to pass as men and women who wish to present themselves in a masculine gender role without identifying as a man. Diane Torr began leading Drag King Workshops in 1989 that offer women a lesson in passing as men. Torr was featured in the 2002 film on drag kings Venus Boyz.

Drag kings have historically been more marginalised by pop culture than drag queens, who began playing a larger role in mainstream pop culture from the late 20th Century onwards. Drag kings have also historically been marginalised in academic LGBT studies. Recently, drag kings have started to play a slightly more visible role in the LGBT community. Sleek Magazine described this renaissance of drag king culture in a 2019 article titled "What's behind the drag king revolution?"

The British drag king collective 'Pecs', a troupe made up entirely of women and non-binary people, was founded in 2013 and went on to perform at Soho Theatre and The Glory. In 2016 director Nicole Miyahara produced The Making of a King, a documentary film chronicling the lives of contemporary drag kings in Los Angeles. The first drag king to appear in a television show was New Zealand artist and comedian Hugo Grrrl who won the inaugural season of the New Zealand reality competition House of Drag in 2018. In 2019 American artist Landon Cider was the first drag king and cisgender woman to appear on a televised US drag competition when he won the third season of The Boulet Brother's Dragula.

Drag community

A British lesbian cabaret organisation called Lesburlesque made it part of their mission to promote drag kings on the wider British cabaret circuit. Their founder Pixie Truffle gave an interview to the Guardian newspaper in the United Kingdom on her desire for drag kings to close the gap with queens and with male stand-up comedians.

Similar to some drag queens who prefer to be seen as actors—like Justin Bond and Lypsinka—some drag kings prefer not to be pigeon-holed by the drag king label. "I think when people assume that somebody is queer, or different, or trans, they always want to put something before their name," said Murray Hill in an interview. "And that is what drag king has been. Why can not you just call me a comedian like Jerry Seinfeld is called a comedian?"

In recent years, some drag king performers have adopted other terms to describe their own performance styles, particularly if they deviate from the more traditional forms of "kinging". Common names including "gender blurring" acknowledge the merging of both male and female traits in the performances. Vancouver performer Rose Butch adopted the ambiguous label "drag thing". Long-time performer Flare called the stage of drag king styles that emerged in Toronto's scene in the mid-2010s as "unicorn drag".

Tools of gender illusion
Face: One method drag kings use to modify their facial features is burning a wine cork and smudging it along the jaw to create the illusion of a beard or stubble. Kings may aim to deepen the colour of their eyebrows or create a fuller look with dark eyeliner or other makeup. Similarly some methods call for layering liquid eyeliner over the cork ash, or dark makeup, base. When trying to achieve a realistic look, drag kings may add crepe hair over the makeup using glue, thus completing the illusion of a full beard.

Look: Drag kings also make use of items such as socks and silicone prosthetics when packing, creating the illusion of a male appendage between the legs.

Stage Presence and Performance: An important part of gender illusion, this refers to the way a drag performer utilises body language and takes up space on stage. Some kings will incorporate more aggressive choreography into their routines to emulate or expand on stereotypical masculine characteristics. Accessories, rhinestones and elaborate costumes contribute to a drag king's performance.

Breast binding
Body shaping apparel, most commonly binders, kinesiology tape, and sports bras, are used to create the look of a flat chest. For hiding one's breasts some use a method involving cutting a hole in the crotch of pantyhose for the head and making sleeves out the legs.

In entertainment

In film
Victor/Victoria (1982)
Connie and Carla (2004)
Midnight Asia (2022)

In literature
2016–present – Moriarty the Patriot, in which the spy known as James Bond is a drag king persona of Irene Adler, an associate of Sherlock Holmes and the titular Moriarty brothers.

In music
2021 – Little Mix presented as drag kings in their music video 'Confetti'

See also 

 Female queen (drag)
 Genres Pluriels
 Lesbianism
 Lesburlesque
 List of drag kings
 List of transgender-related topics
 Pepi Litman
 Postgenderism
 Principal boy
 Queer
 Takarazuka Revue
 Tomboy
 Transvestism
 Travesti
 Of Drag Kings and the Wheel of Fate (novel)

References

Further reading

External links 
Drag king resources

 'How to be a drag king' by London king Lenna Cumberbatch 
 Anderson Toone's drag king time-line with photos and events
 Art of Drag Kinging by Dante DiFranco
 Drag Kingdom, Germany king networking and events site
 
 San Francisco Drag King Contest, the oldest (and possibly largest) drag king event
 UK and Irish Drag Kings, Drag King Photography
 Technodyke's drag king archived articles and interviews
 Girls will be boys : an article on the otokoyaku, or male role players, of the all-female Japanese Takarazuka Revue
 Radio Documentary, The Drag King Show, produced by JD Doyle for Queer Music Heritage including interviews with Anderson Toone and Leigh Crow.

Drag (clothing)
 
Gay masculinity
Gender roles
Gender roles in the LGBT community
Performance art